The Ilyushin Il-80 (NATO reporting name: Maxdome) is a Russian airborne command and control aircraft modified from the Ilyushin Il-86 airliner.

Development

The Ilyushin Il-80 has the NATO reporting name Maxdome (though some sources claim it uses the reporting name Camber, like the Il-86 passenger jet). The Russian reporting name for the aircraft is Aimak, or Eimak (Mongolian for "clan"). The aircraft is believed to have first flown in the summer of 1985, with the first post-modification flight taking place on March 5, 1987, and deliveries starting later that year. In all, four aircraft are known to have been converted from Il-86s. They were registered CCCP-86146 through 86149, and were first observed by western photographers in 1992.

Heavily modified from the Ilyushin Il-86, the Il-80 (also referred to as the Il-86VKP) is meant to be used as an airborne command center for Russian officials, including the President, in the event of nuclear war. The role of the Ilyushin Il-80 is similar to that of the Boeing E-4B. The Il-80 has no external windows (save those in the cockpit), to shield it from a nuclear blast and nuclear electromagnetic pulse. Only the upper deck forward door on the left and the aft door on the right remain from the standard design. There is only one airstair door, instead of three. An unusual baffle blocks the aft cockpit windows. This may serve to block EMP or RF pulses.

Unlike the standard Il-86 airliner, the Il-80 has two electrical generator pods mounted inboard of the engine nacelles. Each pod is approximately 9.5 metres (32 feet) long and 1.3 metres (4 feet) in diameter. Both pods include landing lights.

Like the E-4B, the aircraft has a dorsal SATCOM canoe, believed to house advanced satellite communications equipment, and a trailing wire antenna mounted in the lower aft fuselage for very low frequency (VLF) radio transmission and reception (likely for communication with ballistic missile submarines).

Replacement
When the present upgrades have reached the end of their life, it is expected that a new airborne command post, based on the Ilyushin Il-96-400M commercial aircraft and delivered as the so-called Doomsday plane, will replace them.

Operation
Upon completion, all four Il-80s were delivered to the 8th Special Purposes Aviation Division at the Chkalovsky Airbase near Moscow.

As of 2011 three Il-80s remain in service. They are painted in the current livery of Aeroflot, the Russian state airline; and carry international civilian registrations RA-86147, RA-86148, and RA-86149. The first Il-80, registration RA-86146, has been photographed without engines and is apparently out of service. The aircraft are rarely observed in operation, though at least one was seen at an air show.

In December 2020, Russian media reported that radio communication equipment had been stolen from one of the Il-80s while it was undergoing maintenance.

Operators

 Russian Air Force - 8th Special Purpose Aviation Division, Chkalovsky Airport

Similar aircraft
 Boeing E-4
 Northrop Grumman E-8 Joint STARS
 TACAMO
 Tu-214PU

See also
 Doomsday plane

References

External links

Il-80 (Il-86VKP) images - www.airliners.net

Il-080
1980s Soviet command and control aircraft
Quadjets
Aircraft first flown in 1987